Neuroserpin is a protein that in humans is encoded by the SERPINI1 gene.

It is associated with Familial encephalopathy with neuroserpin inclusion bodies.

Serine protease inhibitors of the serpin superfamily are involved in many cellular processes. Neuroserpin was first identified as a protein secreted from the axons of dorsal root ganglion neurons (Stoeckli et al., 1989). It is expressed in the late stages of neurogenesis during the process of synapse formation.[supplied by OMIM]

Interactions
SERPINI1 has been shown to interact with Tissue plasminogen activator.

References

Further reading

External links
 The MEROPS online database for peptidases and their inhibitors: I04.025